The Pimple is a small cone-shaped peak, 3,215 m, midway between Mount Lister and Camels Hump in the Royal Society Range, in Victoria Land. Discovered and named by the Discovery expedition under Scott, 1901–04.

Mountains of Victoria Land
Scott Coast